Terebra neglecta is a species of sea snail, a marine gastropod mollusc in the family Terebridae, the auger snails.

Description

Distribution

References

 Poppe G.T., Tagaro S.P. & Terryn Y. (2009) New Terebridae from the Philippines. Visaya 2(4): 57-62

External links
 Fedosov, A. E.; Malcolm, G.; Terryn, Y.; Gorson, J.; Modica, M. V.; Holford, M.; Puillandre, N. (2020). Phylogenetic classification of the family Terebridae (Neogastropoda: Conoidea). Journal of Molluscan Studies

Terebridae
Gastropods described in 2009